Roberto Venturato (born 14 April 1963) is an Australian-born Italian football coach and former player, most recently in charge as manager of Serie B club SPAL.

Playing career
Venturato was born in Australia to Italian immigrants who moved back to Veneto in 1973. A midfielder, he spent the majority of his career playing in the minor professional leagues of Italy (as well as amateur level) for a number of teams, most notably Cremonese and Pergocrema. He retired in 1996 after two seasons with then-amateurs Pizzighettone.

Coaching career
After retiring from active football, Venturato stayed at Pizzighettone, where he took over a role as youth coach and non-playing staff member. In 2002, he was named new head coach and guided the club to win the Serie D title, thus ensuring a historic first promotion to the professional football ranks for the small Lombardian club. In 2005, he won one further promotion, guiding Pizzighettone to win the Serie C2 playoffs, and remained at the club until 2007 serving as head coach for two full seasons at Serie C1 level.

After relegating in 2007, Venturato left Pizzighettone to serve as Emiliano Mondonico's assistant at Cremonese. He stayed at Cremonese also in 2008 as Ivo Iaconi's assistant, a role he maintained also after the reappointment of Mondonico during that very season. In March 2009 he replaced Mondonico as new head coach of Cremonese, serving at this role until June 2010, when he left after losing the Serie C1 promotion playoff final to Varese.

After two years without a club during which he took a job as a financial promoter, Venturato moved back into management as head coach of Serie D club Pergolettese (heir of his former playing club Pergocrema), which he promptly guided to promotion to Serie C2 on his first and only season in charge. In October 2013 he took over at Serie D club Piacenza, being however removed from his managerial duties in January 2014 due to poor results. He successively returned to Pergolettese (now back to Serie D) the following season.

In July 2015 Venturato was named new head coach of Cittadella in the Lega Pro league, replacing long-time manager Claudio Foscarini. On his first full season in charge, Foscarini won promotion to Serie B as Lega Pro champions, and was confirmed for the club's 2016–17 Serie B campaign, which Venturato started with style thanks to five consecutive wins in the first five games of the season.

In the 2018–19 Serie B season, Venturato successfully led Cittadella to seventh place in the regular season and then a spot in the promotion playoff finals, eliminating third-placed Benevento in the semi-finals. Venturato left Cittadella by the end of the 2020–21 Serie B season, after six years in charge, following a 2–1 aggregate defeat to Venezia in the promotion playoff finals.

On 5 January 2022, he was appointed new head coach of Serie B club SPAL, signing a one-and-a-half year contract. He was dismissed on 9 October 2022, following a 2–0 loss at Frosinone, leaving SPAL in fourteenth place in the 2022–23 Serie B league table.

Managerial statistics

References

1963 births
Living people
Italian footballers
Association football midfielders
Venezia F.C. players
U.S. Cremonese players
Italian football managers
U.S. Cremonese managers
A.S. Cittadella managers
S.P.A.L. managers
Serie B managers